Santa Isabel is a barrio in the municipality of Utuado, Puerto Rico. Its population in 2010 was 660.

Geography
Santa Isabel is a remote barrio situated at an elevation of  just south of Ángeles in Utuado, Puerto Rico.

History
Puerto Rico was ceded by Spain in the aftermath of the Spanish–American War under the terms of the Treaty of Paris of 1898 and became an unincorporated territory of the United States. In 1899, the United States Department of War conducted a census of Puerto Rico finding that the population of Santa Isabel barrio was 875.

See also

 List of communities in Puerto Rico

References

Barrios of Utuado, Puerto Rico